An atomic clock is a time keeping device.

Atomic Clock Ensemble in Space science project
 a clock updated by radio signals which is sometimes called an "atomic clock" Radio clock
the clock as a measure for risk of catastrophic destruction Doomsday Clock

Music
Atomic Clock, nickname of Zimmers Hole drummer Gene Hoglan
 Atomic Clock (musician), solo name of The Earlies keyboardist Giles Hatton

Albums
Atomic Clock (Zion I album), 2010
Atomic Clock, an album by Gene Hoglan
Atomic Clock, an album by Mark Helias, 2006
The Atomic Clock DVD, by Gene Hoglan

Songs
"Atomic Clock", a song by Mark Helias
"Atomic Clock", a song by Monster Magnet from Powertrip